Guigo is a given name. Notable people with the name include:

 Guigo I (1083–1136), Carthusian monk
 Guigo II (died 1188 or 1193), Carthusian monk
 Guigo de Ponte (died 1297), Carthusian monk